Milesia caesarea is a species of hoverfly in the family Syrphidae. It was originally discovered in 1990 by Peter Khramov.

Distribution
India.

References

Insects described in 1990
Eristalinae
Diptera of Asia